Liu Yi (born 26 August 1988) is a Chinese footballer currently plays as a centre-back or left-back for Shaanxi Chang'an Athletic.

Club career
Liu Yi would be promoted from the Tianjin TEDA F.C. youth team into the senior team during the 2009 league season after competing in the 2008 AFC U-19 Championship for China where they finished in the quarter-finals. On October 28, 2009 Liu Yi was suspended for one year and fined 10,000 Yuan by the Chinese Football Association for lying about his age to compete in the tournament. After his suspension finished he would join second tier club Shenyang Dongjin at the beginning of the 2011 league season.

On February 3, 2015 Liu Yi would join Harbin Yiteng for the start of the 2015 league season. After only one season Liu Yi would move to Beijing Enterprises Group on a club record fee of 20 million Yuan. After three season he would join top tier club Wuhan Zall at the start of the 2019 Chinese Super League season.

Career statistics
.

References

External links
 

1988 births
Living people
Chinese footballers
Association football defenders
China League Two players
China League One players
Chinese Super League players
Tianjin Jinmen Tiger F.C. players
Shenyang Dongjin players
Zhejiang Yiteng F.C. players
Beijing Sport University F.C. players
Wuhan F.C. players